The 1973 Swedish Open, also known as the Swedish International Tennis Championships, was a men's tennis tournament played on outdoor clay courts held in Båstad, Sweden. It was classified as a Group B category tournament and was part of the 1973 Grand Prix circuit. It was the 26th edition of the tournament and was held from 8 July through 15 July 1973. First-seeded Stan Smith won the singles title and earned $8,400 first-prize money. It was the third tournament he won in Sweden within an eight month period, after the Stockholm Open on hard court in November 1972 and the Swedish Pro on carpet court in April 1973.

Finals

Singles

 Stan Smith defeated  Manuel Orantes 6–4, 6–2, 7–6
 It was Smith' 8th singles title of the year and the 53rd of his career.

Doubles

 Nikola Pilić /  Stan Smith defeated  Bob Carmichael /  Frew McMillan 2–6, 6–4, 6–4

References

External links
 ITF tournament edition details

Swedish Open
Swedish Open
Swedish Open
July 1973 sports events in Europe